Peter Bloomfield (born 30 June 1936) is a New Zealand cricketer. He played in six first-class matches for Central Districts from 1957 to 1959.

See also
 List of Central Districts representative cricketers

References

External links
 

1936 births
Living people
New Zealand cricketers
Central Districts cricketers
Cricketers from Motueka